Striatoguraleus is a genus of sea snails, marine gastropod mollusks in the family Horaiclavidae.

Distribution
Species in this marine genus occur off South Africa.

Species
Species within the genus Striatoguraleus include:
 Striatoguraleus electrinus Kilburn, 1994
 Striatoguraleus himaeformis Kilburn, 1994
 Striatoguraleus laticulmen Kilburn, 1994
 Striatoguraleus thetis (Smith E. A., 1904)
 Striatoguraleus vellicatus Kilburn, 1994

References

 Kilburn, R. N. "Turridae (Mollusca: Gastropoda) of southern Africa and Mozambique. Part 7. Subfamily Crassispirinae, section 2." Annals of the Natal Museum 35.1 (1994): 177-228

External links
  Tucker, J.K. 2004 Catalog of recent and fossil turrids (Mollusca: Gastropoda). Zootaxa 682:1-1295.
 Specimen at MNHN, Paris

 
Horaiclavidae
Gastropod genera